Magnus Hall (born 1959) is a Swedish business executive and the former CEO of Vattenfall; he served as the company's CEO between October 2014 and October 2020. Prior to this, he served from 2004-2014 as CEO of Holmen. From 2001-2004 he was CEO of Holmen's paper products division; he began his career with Holmen Paper in 1987, after a two-year stint at Holmens Bruk. He graduated from the Linköping Institute of Technology and Georgetown University (on the Fulbright Scholarship).

References

1959 births
Living people
Swedish chief executives
Vattenfall
Fulbright alumni